Rosetta Code is a wiki-based programming website with implementations of common algorithms and solutions to various programming problems in many different programming languages. It is named for the Rosetta Stone, which has the same text inscribed on it in three languages, and thus allowed Egyptian hieroglyphs to be deciphered for the first time.

Website
Rosetta Code was created in 2007 by Michael Mol. The site's content is licensed under the GNU Free Documentation License 1.2, though some components may be dual-licensed under more permissive terms.

The Rosetta Code web repository illustrates how desired functionality is implemented very differently in various programming paradigms, and how "the same" task is accomplished in different programming languages.

, Rosetta Code has:
   1,121 computer programming tasks (or problems)
     303 additional draft programming tasks
     810 computer programming languages that are used to solve tasks
  83,043 computer programming language examples/entries
 
In August 2022, Rosetta Code migrated from independent hosting to Miraheze.

Data and structure
The Rosetta Code site is organized as a browsable cross-section of tasks (specific programming problems or considerations) and computer programming languages. A task's page displays visitor-contributed solutions in various computer languages, allowing a viewer to compare each language's approach to the task's stated problem. 

Task pages are included in per-language listings based on the languages of provided solutions; a task with a solution in the C programming language will appear in the listing for C. If the same task has a solution in Ruby, the task will appear in the listing for Ruby as well.

Languages
Some of the computer programming languages found on Rosetta Code  (which have Wikipedia descriptions)  include: 

A complete list of the computer programming languages that have examples (entries/solutions to the Rosetta Code tasks) is available.

Tasks
Some of the tasks found on Rosetta Code include:

See also
 Example-centric programming

References

External links
 

Programming language comparisons
Wikis about programming